is a Japanese photographer. Ohara is most noted for his series of photographs titled One, in which he presents faces with a standard size and tone.

Ohara moved from Tokyo to New York City in 1962, and came to public attention in 1970 with the publication of One, which contained more than 500 tight close-ups of faces. In the 30 years since then, Ohara has continued his portrait studies in greatly varied forms.

This extensive collection presents seven projects in their entirety, pieces made between 1970 and 2003, some of which were first exhibited at the New York Museum of Modern Art, and others that have rarely been seen. They range from radical close-ups of hundreds of anonymous faces to a self-portrait made up of photos shot every minute for a period of 24 hours to journals—Ohara once documented a year in 365 images on an accordion fold. Also included are portraits in which the exposure period for each face exceeded an hour. Ohara's work offers an intense examination of space and time in portraiture and provokes a rethinking of the limits of photographic depiction.

Ohara resides in Los Angeles, California with his wife, Coralee and two children Sophia and Teiji John.

References
Nihon shashinka jiten / 328 Outstanding Japanese Photographers. Kyoto: Tankōsha, 2000. .  Despite the English-language alternative title, all in Japanese.

Japanese photographers
1942 births
Living people